Zoe Wiseman (born 1970 in Marion, Indiana) is a former American model and is now a photographer known for her fine art nude photography, and is the web owner of Community Zoe  which promotes specifically fine art nude photography. Several photo books, soundtracks and magazines have showcased her photography and she has won Gold in the PX3 - Prix de la Photographie, Paris in 2022.

Photo books and magazines
Passion and Desire (Edition Skylight 2005)
Fine Art Photo Magazine (Hillebrand 2004 & 2007)
Photo Art Magazine (2007)
DISCONTINUde (Blurb 2008)
"210 Photographers" (1X Publishing, Sweden)
Nudes Index II (Feierabend 2009)
"i spy with my plastic eye" (A&I December 2009)
"Fiat Lux" - Fine Art Nudes by Zoe Wiseman - (A&I February 2010)
"Le Nu" - Fine Art Nude Photography book (A&I May 2010)
"Silvergrain Classics - analog photography magazine (December 2021)

Soundtracks
Moog
Saw II, Original Score by Charlie Clouser

Personal life
In the summer of 2007, Wiseman married longtime boyfriend Charlie Clouser.

References

Photo Art Magazine
https://px3.fr/winners/px3/2022/12878/

1970 births
Living people
American photographers
Female models from Indiana
People from Marion, Indiana
American women photographers
21st-century American women